San Juan Airport may refer to:

 Luis Muñoz Marín International Airport, serving San Juan, Puerto Rico
 Domingo Faustino Sarmiento Airport, serving San Juan, Argentina
 Ohkay Owingeh Airport, formerly known as the San Juan Pueblo Airport
 Fernando Ribas Dominicci Airport, a secondary commercial airport also serving San Juan, Puerto Rico (also known as Isla Grande Airport) 
 San Juan Airport in San Juan, Beni Department, Bolivia